Andriy Ivashko (1980 – 24 February 2022) was a Ukrainian soldier who was killed during the Russian invasion of Ukraine in February 2022. He is Hero of Ukraine with the award of the Order of the Golden Star.

Biography 

Andrey Ivashko was born in 1980 in Krolevets, Sumy Oblast.

On 6 December 2019, he was awarded general diplomas of the chairmen of the Hlukhiv District State Administration and the District Council on the occasion of the Defenders of Ukraine Day.

On 24 February 2022, he was killed on the first day of the Russian invasion of Ukraine. He served in the air defense forces located near the village of Oblozhky in a military unit known as Hlukhiv-2. During the rocket attack, at the cost of his life, Andriy Ivashko personally gave information about the actions of the enemy. In the early morning of this day, Russian troops attempted to break through the border near Bachivsk, but were stopped near Hlukhiv, where military clashes ensued.

Awards 
 the title of Hero of Ukraine with the award of the Order of the Golden Star (2022, posthumously) — for personal courage and heroism shown in the defense of the state sovereignty and territorial integrity of Ukraine, loyalty to the military oath.

References

External links 

president.gov.ua About conferring the title of Hero of Ukraine

1980 births
2022 deaths
Recipients of the Order of Gold Star (Ukraine)
Ukrainian military personnel killed in the 2022 Russian invasion of Ukraine
People from Sumy Oblast